Günther Mader (born 24 June 1964) is a former alpine ski racer and Olympic medalist from Austria. Born in Matrei am Brenner, Tyrol, he is one of only five men to have won World Cup races in all five alpine disciplines (downhill, super G, giant slalom, slalom, and combined).

Career
Mader made his World Cup debut at age 18 and competed for 16 seasons, including four Winter Olympics and seven world championships.  He was the bronze medalist in the downhill at the 1992 Olympics and won a total of six medals in the world championships. He won his first championship medal, the silver medal in the Slalom Race at Crans Montana in 1987, after only placing eighth after the first leg of the competition. Mader won two World Cup season titles, giant slalom in 1990 and combined in 1996, and placed second in the overall World Cup standings in 1995 and 1996, and third in 1990. Without his 14 wins, he did achieve another 27 places in World Cup races.

His only World Cup victory in downhill was the prestigious Hahnenkamm in Kitzbühel, Austria, in 1996 at age 31.  Mader retired from competition after the 1998 season with 14 World Cup victories, 44 podiums, and 146 top ten finishes.

Only 13 days after his retirement in March 1998, he suffered a stroke: as a result the right side of his body was paralysed and he lost 85 percent of his vocabulary. However he recovered to the greatest possible extent. After convalescence, he wrote a book titled ÜberLeben which covered his career, the stroke and his work as director of racing at ski manufacturer Salomon in Austria, a position he took up during his recovery from his stroke. ÜberLeben has a double meaning in German, translatable as "about life" but also as "survival".

World Cup victories

Season titles

Individual races
 14 victories - (1 DH, 6 SG, 2 GS, 1 SL, 4 K)
 44 podiums - (6 DH, 12 SG, 8 GS, 5 SL, 13 K)

References

External links
 
 
  

Austrian male alpine skiers
Olympic bronze medalists for Austria
Olympic alpine skiers of Austria
Alpine skiers at the 1988 Winter Olympics
Alpine skiers at the 1992 Winter Olympics
Alpine skiers at the 1994 Winter Olympics
Alpine skiers at the 1998 Winter Olympics
1964 births
Living people
Olympic medalists in alpine skiing
FIS Alpine Ski World Cup champions
Medalists at the 1992 Winter Olympics
Recipients of the Decoration of Honour for Services to the Republic of Austria